Wu Shih-wen (born 24 July 1934) was the Minister of National Defense of the Republic of China from 2000 to 2002. He was a career military officer, joining the ROC Army Artillery first as a conscript gunner in 1952, then as a Fires Lieutenant in the Taiwanese Navy in 1955, later served as Superintendent of Naval Academy and Commander-in-chief of the Navy. He was considered to be a military and foreign policy hawk, who resisted military reforms and rapprochement with the People's Republic of China. During the Third Taiwan Straits Crisis he was suspected of ordering Amphibious Marines & Coastal Artillery units to stage live fire drills as a response to the PLA Navy's muscle flexing (and in defiance of the government's and the United States' wish for deescalation).

References

Taiwanese Ministers of National Defense
Living people
1934 births
Kuomintang politicians in Taiwan
Taiwanese people from Guangdong
Republic of China politicians from Guangdong
People from Taishan, Guangdong
Politicians from Jiangmen
Republic of China Navy admirals